Pardesi Babu is a 1998 Indian Hindi-language comedy drama film directed by Manoj Agrawal, starring Govinda, Raveena Tandon and Shilpa Shetty.

Plot summary

Raju Pardesi (Govinda), a poor villager, relocates to Mumbai for a better life. He falls in love with a rich guy's daughter, Chinni (Shilpa Shetty). Chinni's father opposes their love and challenges Raju to acquire INR one crore within a year if he wants to marry Chinni.
Pardesi reaches to the tea plantation in Darjeeling, where he meets Karuna (Raveena Tandon) who is there as their maid. Pardesi and Karuna eventually fall in love. Meanwhile, the tea business grows and Pardesi is able to collect the required money within a year. However, as the returning time nears, Karuna discovers that Pardesi loves Chinni, and becomes very sad. Pardesi goes to tell her the truth, but discovers that the suitcase which he got at the railway station was of Karuna's father, who is now suffering with a mental trauma. Pardesi feels that it is his fault and decides to marry Karuna. However, at the day of their marriage, Chinni comes there and sees that Pardesi is marrying Karuna. She gets to know the entire story and decides to return. Karuna also gets the entire story and finally decides that the true bride for Pardesi is Chinni. The story ends with Pardesi and Chinni's marriage.

Cast
Govinda as Raju Pardesi 
Raveena Tandon as Karuna
Shilpa Shetty as Chinni Chopra
Shashikala as Mai The Landlady 
Satish Kaushik as Harpal Happy Singh
Aasif Sheikh as Nandu (Union leader of the factory)
Virendra Saxena as Scientist
Mohnish Behl as Naren 
Arun Bakshi as Thief
Avtar Gill as Doctor 
Rajeev Verma as Mr. Chopra (Chinni's Father)
Gavin Packard as Wrestler
Suresh Chatwal as Referee in Wrestling Competition 
Deepak Qazir as Ramji (Karuna's father)

Soundtrack
The music of all the tracks of Pardesi Babu were composed by Anand Raj Anand. Tracks like "It Happens Only In India", "Jave Sajna Main Nahin Karna" and "Kuch Khona Hai Kuch Pana Hai" gained a lot of popularity, although all tracks of the movie were popular. Mohammad Ali Ikram of Planet Bollywood quoted about the album-"Give Pardesi Babu a few listenings; it is an album which, as promised, comes Straight from the Heart."

References

External links
 

1998 films
1990s Hindi-language films
Films scored by Anand Raj Anand